Porter Hinman Dale (March 1, 1867October 6, 1933) was a member of both the United States House of Representatives and later the United States Senate from Vermont.

Early life and career

The son of Lieutenant Governor George N. Dale and Helen (Hinman) Dale, Porter Dale was born in Island Pond, Vermont on March 1, 1867.

Dale attended public schools in his hometown and went on to study at Eastman Business College.  Later he studied in Philadelphia and Boston, and he spent two years studying elocution and oratory with James Edward Murdoch, a Shakespearean scholar and actor.

Upon completion of his education, he taught school at the Green Mountain Seminary in Waterbury, Vermont, and at Bates College in Lewiston, Maine.  Dale then studied law with his father, was admitted to the bar in 1896, and practiced in Island Pond. After the death of his father, Dale practiced in partnership with Harry B. Amey.

Dale served as chief deputy collector of customs at Island Pond from 1897 to 1910, when he resigned and was appointed judge of the Brighton municipal court.  He also served in the state militia as colonel on the staff Governor Josiah Grout, and he was also involved in the lumber, electric, and banking businesses.

In 1900 he was an unsuccessful candidate for the Republican nomination in the election for Vermont's Second District seat in the U.S. House.  Dale was elected to the Vermont State Senate in 1910 and served two two-year terms.

House of Representatives
In 1914, Dale was a candidate for the Republican U.S. House nomination in Vermont's 2nd District.  He defeated Alexander Dunnett on the 21st ballot at the state party convention, and went on to win the general election. He served from March 4, 1915 to August 11, 1923, when he resigned to become a candidate for the United States Senate.  Dale served as chairman of the Committee on Expenditures in the Department of the Treasury during the Sixty-Sixth and Sixty-Seventh Congresses.

First inauguration of Calvin Coolidge 
Dale was campaigning for the Senate on the night of August 2, 1923 when he heard of the death of President Warren G. Harding.  Calvin Coolidge was staying at the home of his father John Calvin Coolidge Sr. in Plymouth, Vermont, and Dale traveled to the Coolidge home to ensure that Coolidge was informed and to offer his assistance.  By most accounts, it was Dale who suggested persistently that Coolidge be sworn in immediately to ensure continuity in the presidency, and Dale witnessed Coolidge receiving the oath of office from John Coolidge early on the morning of August 3.  Dale drafted and revised a written an account of this event, which his grandson  Porter H. Dale II and great-grandson Christopher Dale later discovered and published in the Journal of Vermont History in 1994.

U.S. Senate 
Dale was elected to the United States Senate on November 6, 1923 for the remainder of the term ending March 3, 1927, which had been made vacant by the death of William P. Dillingham.  Dale was reelected in 1926 and 1932, and served from November 7, 1923, until his death.  He was chairman of the Committee on Civil Service (Sixty-ninth through Seventy-second Congresses).

Death and burial
Dale died at his summer home on Lake Willoughby in Westmore, Vermont on October 6, 1933.  He was buried in Lakeside Cemetery in Island Pond.

Family
In 1891, Dale married Amy K. Bartlett (b. 1861) of Island Pond.  She died on August 1, 1907, and in 1910 he married Augusta M. Wood (1876-1961) of Boston.  With his first wife, Dale was the father of Marian (1892-1975), Timothy (1894-1977), Amy (1895-1938), and George (1898-1962).

See also
 List of United States Congress members who died in office (1900–49)

References

External links

Porter Hinman Dale at Find A Grave

1867 births
1933 deaths
Vermont lawyers
Eastman Business College alumni
Bates College faculty
Island Pond, Vermont
Republican Party Vermont state senators
Republican Party United States senators from Vermont
People from Brighton, Vermont
Vermont state court judges
Burials in Vermont
Republican Party members of the United States House of Representatives from Vermont
American lawyers admitted to the practice of law by reading law
20th-century American politicians
19th-century American lawyers
20th-century American judges
Vermont National Guard personnel